Jamie DeWolf (born October 28, 1977) is an American slam poet, film director, writer, spoken word artist, and circus ringmaster from Oakland, California.

DeWolf is best known for his early career as a slam poetry champion, his award-winning films for Youth Speaks Bigger Picture Project, live tours with the performance trio The Suicide Kings, hosting the monthly Tourettes Without Regrets at the Oakland Metro OperaHouse, and for his work as a producer and performer on NPR's Snap Judgment. DeWolf has appeared on HBO's Def Poetry, 60 Minutes, UPN, Inside Edition, and CBS. DeWolf directed, wrote and starred in the feature film Smoked. The Movie (2012).

He is also the great-grandson of author and Scientology founder L. Ron Hubbard and an outspoken critic of the Church of Scientology. In 2000 he hosted the first ever anti-Scientology summit in Clearwater, Florida. He was named one of the "Top 25 People Crippling Scientology" by The Village Voice in 2011.

Early life
De Wolf was born in Eureka, California. Raised Baptist, DeWolf was a "hardcore Christian kid" who hoped to become a minister. At the age of six, his pastor handed him a book titled The Kingdom of the Cults. It referred to contemporary religious movements, one of which stuck out: Scientology, founded to his surprise by his own great-grandfather, L. Ron Hubbard. Since that point, DeWolf became fascinated with his ancestor's legacy, reading his books, and citing Hubbard's legacy as his inspiration to become an artist. "I remember idolizing L. Ron as a kid, and I remember asking my mom all the time why couldn't I meet him," admits DeWolf. "I didn't know at that point that he had created a religion, I just knew when I went into a bookstore I could find books by him—he was evidence to me that you could be a writer simply by your will alone. Outside of this man running this crazy church and brainwashing millions of people, at the same time he was just another family member."

DeWolf calls his great-grandfather "one of the greatest con men of the last century." "I wanted to meet him," DeWolf said of Hubbard. "But he was already in hiding by the time I was born. I was told not to ask my grandfather, L. Ron, Jr., about him," DeWolf said. "L. Ron and L. Ron, Jr. were locked in this dangerous end-game, where Junior was trying to flush him out of hiding." DeWolf's grandfather, L. Ron Hubbard Jr., was born in 1934 into a front-row seat for the creation of Scientology. He helped with that family business for a while, but later told Penthouse that "99% of anything my father ever wrote or said about himself is untrue," and compared Scientology's inner sanctum, the "Sea Org," with the Hitler Youth. "I was incredibly religious. Super devout," said DeWolf. "I would stand on street corners passing out pamphlets warning about the apocalypse." Yet he entered adolescence feeling alone and troubled, as if a "toxic Molotov cocktail" simmered inside him.

"Ever since I was young I would often get sent to the school psychiatrist for what I was writing. A lot of it was just too macabre, in retrospect. But I realized, even when I was a Christian kid, that a lot of what drew me into Christianity—and what they were certainly exploiting—was my fascination with demonology and the apocalypse, the Antichrist and the Whore of Babylon. I must have read the Book of Revelation 10,000 times by the time I was ten years old." He began unleashing more poetry—and more demons—at the microphones that were just opening up in the bedroom communities of Benicia and Vallejo in the late 1990s. "I would come in with this fire and blood," DeWolf said. "And they did not want that."

Slam poetry 
He found himself going to open-mic sessions but it was only when he found poetry slams that he came into his own. "The first time I went to a poetry slam, it was the only place that people wouldn't kick me out; they would just give me low scores." "The competition made me better. It also made me aware of how my words could set the mood of an entire room." "I started in Vallejo and Benicia so I have a lot of love for people who just completely are defiant in the space of small towns who create a space for people to speak and to create an open forum. It's like flame throwers for moths. There's a lot of magic that can happen with that. It certainly changed my life." "Poetry and spoken word became an outlet for everything that was naked and confessional. There's something raw about simply telling your story without pretense, without props, just you and a microphone. There's no hiding up there, it's just you and your ghosts."

Since his first slam in 1999, DeWolf won his way onto seven slam teams, competing on the finals stage at the National Poetry Slam on his first team. He has since become a National Poetry Slam Champion, the Berkeley Grand Slam Champion, a YouthSpeaks Mentor, a featured performer on HBO's Def Poetry Jam hosted by Mos Def, appearing in Season Three with his poem "Grim Fairy Tale", and taping for Season Five with Dave Chappelle and Lauryn Hill. DeWolf's style has been described as "raw and raucous." "He brings that same inimitable, avant-garde style to everything he does—poetry, playwriting, performance and his latest endeavor, filmmaking."

At the same time he began participating in Poetry Slam, DeWolf started teaching Slam in high schools. "It gave me a driving force to help the kids like me and give them another model. It made me realize I had survived and chosen art as an escape route." "Too often we ignore what young people have to say and they're not asked to express themselves authentically– people are shoved into writing essays and taught how to speak. That's why bringing slam poetry to kids empowers them and encourages them to think about what they want in a way that they want." Since his Slam beginnings, DeWolf has performed and led writing workshops at over 90 universities, high schools and juvenile detention centers across the globe, working with such organizations as Opera Piccola, Lunchbox International, and Youth Speaks.

In 2001 the San Francisco Chronicle characterized DeWolf as "a nationally recognized slam poet". His work has been featured on 60 Minutes, UPN and NPR. He coached the Youth Speaks team twice, one of which was featured on Brave New Voices on HBO hosted by Common and Rosario Dawson. He opened for B. Dolan on the first Church of Love and Ruin tour, for Shane Koyczan, and was featured in 2014 on All Def Poetry with his poem "Rebels Without Applause." He was awarded The East Bay Express Best of the Bay "Best Poet" twice, in both 2012 and 2013.

The Suicide Kings 
As a member of The Suicide Kings performance trio (with Geoff Trenchard and Rupert Estanislao), DeWolf toured the country performing and teaching writing workshops at colleges, high schools, poetry slams, and juvenile detention centers. In 2006 they received funding from the National Performance Network Creation Commission, The Zellerbach Family Foundation, and the City of Oakland to write In Spite of Everything, which premiered at the Oakland Metro, then moved to the EXIT Theatre in San Francisco, eventually touring nationwide and to Moscow. It has been described as "a poignant, chilling knockout of a play ... that beautifully incorporates their visceral verse into the brutal narrative to a school shooting." and "an eight-minute crime caper about the Columbine shootings in reverse." The play was showcased at the Hip Hop Theater Festival in 2007 and was chosen as one of the "top ten" plays of the year by East Bay Express the same year.

The trio performed worldwide at colleges, high schools, juvenile detention centers. In 2004, they toured with Sage Francis and Doomtree on the Abusement Tour.

Tourettes Without Regrets 
In 1999 DeWolf founded the monthly variety show, Tourettes Without Regrets, described on the website as, "One part poetry slam, one part freestyle battle, and one part psychotic erotic vaudeville showcase." "Tourettes Without Regrets is essentially an evening of absurdity, mixed with artistic precision and insanity." "Since 1999, DeWolf has ceaselessly devoted his life to making Tourette's Without Regrets a one-of-a-kind experience for both performers and audience. Commonly known as 'the fight club of underground art,' the variety show acts as a playground for some of the most eccentric and fearless people in the Bay Area." DeWolf says of Tourettes, "I'm promising to push their boundaries, to blow their mind, but also to make something feel absolutely alive. It's like being a reverse cult leader as I'm being naked about wanting to brain wash you for your own entertainment and for a hell of a lot cheaper." "One of their largest shows of the year is the annual 'F*ck Valentines Day Spectacular' which the irreverent DeWolf is at his most festive, presiding over sex toy giveaways, interpretive dances based on worst sex experiences, competitions to find which audience member survived the most odious ex-boyfriend or -girlfriend (the three winners get to have a pig's heart mailed to the ex's house), a game of 'What's Down My Pants?,' and prank calls to former lovers." Tourettes allows DeWolf "to let his inimitable stage presence, fiery banter and wild imagination go full throttle. Most months, "full throttle" includes some measure of burlesque, bondage, dirty haiku tournaments, lap dances, rap battles, sexual pantomiming and things being set on fire, interspersed with spoken word and stand-up comedy."

Over the past 18 years, Tourettes has changed venues repeatedly, moving to Oakland where it started at The Stork Club, then finding its current home where "every month, throngs of fans descend upon the Oakland Metro Operahouse, a chilly warehouse with mottled, tar-spattered cement floors, to witness one of Oakland's strangest attractions. Tourettes Without Regrets is a raunchy, attention-deficit vaudeville extravaganza." The show "combines variety show with game show for a balanced and rhythmic flow of high-energy scenes: the slam judges introduced themselves by mimicking psychotic animals; two previous "dirty haiku" champions faced off in three rounds; a sick beatboxing duo gave a perfectly timed set; a surreal burlesque/performance group combined a flute, some high-flown language, and a Snow White strip-tease, etc." Called "one of the wildest and most creatively raw variety shows in the Bay Area" by SF Weekly, the show has spawned a series of spinoff events, such as the annual Game of Thrones Show, where "the crowd is segregated into Starks and Lannisters and crazed interactive games ensue. You help kill off favorite characters and rewrite the ending of the show yourself." The show includes "a local "choose your own adventure" band whose live show involves twelve-sided dice the size of beach balls. As per the night's theme, the group will perform new material inspired by Game of Thrones." The Holy Sh*t Show, lampoons Scientology, and the yearly XXX Show, started in 2012 at the Mitchell Brothers O'Farrell Theater. In DeWolf's own words about Tourettes, "If you've never been to a rap battle, if you've never been to a poetry slam, if you've never seen burlesque, if you've never seen stand-up comedy, or dirty haiku, or freakish, inventive contests—then that's what the show is for, to put all of those elements into one show. What makes 'Tourettes' individual and unique is throwing all of these elements together and seeing what happens." "It's Psychotic vaudeville. It's taking highbrow and lowbrow and making them collide in this demolition derby." The show has won "The Best of the Bay" multiple times from The East Bay Express, SF Weekly, and the San Francisco Guardian since its inception.

On December 03, 2020, DeWolf announced this would be the final Tourettes Without Regrets and the monthly show would continue under a new name.

The new name of the show is Ruckus and Rumpus Revival. https://www.ruckusandrumpusrevival.com/

Performance 
Beyond his work with spoken word poetry, DeWolf has established himself as a showman and performer in the San Francisco Bay Area. He appears as the regular host for not only Tourettes Without Regrets, but annual festivals such as The East Bay Express Film Awards, Briefs Erotic Film Festival, Scream Film Festival, The Folsom Street Fair, and the Sacramento Horror Film Festival. DeWolf worked as a producer for Oakland-based NPR's Snap Judgement, where he produced a number of stories, and performed several of his own, including The God and the Man, which drew international attention, and The Girl in the Hallway, chronicling the tragedy of Xiana Fairchild, who at age 7 in 1998 was snatched off the street and killed while she lived in the same apartment building as DeWolf.

Smoked the Movie 
In 2006 DeWolf began filming Smoked. The Movie, a feature film crime caper set in Oakland that "tells the story of three low-lifes, played by the Suicide Kings, who rob a cannabis club after their house is burned down—not realizing that the club is owned by local crime lord Tyrone Shanks (local slam poet Abdul Kenyatta)." "Drawn like most of the cast from the spoken word community, Kenyatta's magnetism is so strong that he turns the most cold-blooded character in the film into a kind of hero—one who sees his own criminal pursuits through the prism of class warfare. Shank calls himself a "true motherfuckin' revolutionary," and frequently talks about competing with the CIA for business and targeting rich white folk for addiction." DeWolf spent the next two years "chasing his amateur actors 'El Mariachi-style' through the Netherlands of Oakland." "DeWolf staged wild-west showdowns in broad daylight ... where cinematic hit squads ran around shooting at one another with live blanks." The impetus for Smoked came from an article about a real cannabis club robbery. "'I love crime capers; I love heist films,' said the filmmaker. 'I love the gray illegality of cannabis clubs in general. ... If you robbed a cannabis club what would happen in terms of how would the cops respond?'"

Straight.com called Smoked "mean, bloody, and demented. It's also piss-your-pants hilarious, maddeningly nihilistic, oddly sentimental, weirdly moral, extremely silly, and insanely energetic. It's almost too energetic for the screen, to be honest." "full of orgiastic naked clowns, wanton black revolutionary street executions, crappy ninjas, asshole kids, and seemingly countless hippies being tortured to death." "exaggerating the dark side of the modern marijuana 'industry' to cartoonishly nasty levels." Picked up for distribution by Indican Studios, the studio that released Boondock Saints, it was a featured film at the Rio Grind Theater Film Festival in Vancouver and the Oakland Underground Film Festival. An ambitious undertaking, DeWolf viewed Smoked as an exploration of his city's culture. "There's a lot of history infused in there, a lot of references to Black Panthers and revolution. Oakland and Berkley are right next to each other and even in the history of these cities, there's been this certain element of tension. That tension, and that kind of ideological war, aggression versus pacifism; it's just really interesting to explore."

Films 
A year into the filming of Smoked, DeWolf enrolled in college at the San Francisco State University, where he received a film degree. He collaborated with Youth Speaks, a San Francisco-based organization focused on teen spoken word artists. DeWolf has directed multiple films for Youth Speaks' The Bigger Picture Project, "a joint effort by the non-profit youth development group Youth Speaks and the UCSF Department of Medicine's Center for Vulnerable Populations to raise awareness of type 2 diabetes. "films that flip the motif of the traditional this-is-your-brains-on-drugs PSA style and instead deliver frank messages about the social factors shaping our health. The project also launched a Spanish-language website and two bilingual films, as Latino communities are often disproportionately affected by type 2 diabetes." Featured poets visit Bay Area high schools to perform their poetry and coach students to write their own health justice poetry. The films have garnered national attention. His short film 'Thin Line' about a family stricken with Diabetes and amputations "was the $5000 Grand Prize Winner of the Real Food Media Film Competition. The following year his film "Home Flavoured" also won the Grand Prize. The Thin Line and another Youth Speaks collaboration, The Dealer were accepted into the Food and Farm Film Festival. His film Perfect Soldiers won the youth category of The Sacramento Food Film Festival. In 2015 DeWolf was commissioned to direct a feature-length documentary entitled "Biker with a Moral Compass: Dr. Dick Fine and the Evolving Culture of SFGH", a documentary portraying and paying tribute to the life, times and contributions of UCSF and SFGH physician Dick Fine MD, Founder and Former Director of the General Medicine Clinic. DeWolf's films with The Bigger Picture Project have attracted media attention from civileats.com, Good.is, and KQED. "The Bigger Picture has garnered national attention, including a feature on the homepage of The Huffington Post, over 1 million video views, recognition on Upworthy.com and the Food Farms Films Festival, as well as special presentations at the National Academy of Science's Institute of Medicine Public Health Literacy Roundtable, the National Soda Summit and the James Beard conference. The campaign's most distinguished national awards include the APHA Spirit of 1848 award for best video linking social justice to health, the UCSF 2014 Excellence in Partnership Award, the Real Food Media 2015 Grand Prize, the Latino Coalition for a Healthy California's Young Champion for Latino Health award and most recently best short film in the Youth category at the 2015 Sacramento Food Film Festival."

In 2014 DeWolf worked with Youth Speaks' newly formed Off Page Project to create three pivotal films. "The Off/Page Project combines the analytical lens of The Center for Investigative Reporting with the groundbreaking storytelling of the literary nonprofit Youth Speaks. Living at the intersection of youth voice and civic engagement, the Off/Page Project provides a multimedia platform for young people to investigate the issues and stories that would otherwise be silenced." "In the inaugural video "Whispers from the Fields," 19-year-old Monica Mendoza takes on the challenging issue of sexual violence among migrant women farmworkers." "Their voices and poems and creative art has the power to change aspects of their lives personally, but also to have an impact on another kid's life and another city's life." "This is Home" was "produced as a part of Subsidized Squalor, a collaborative investigation by CIR, KQED and the San Francisco Chronicle that exposed the failures of the Richmond Housing Authority in California and how it has left residents living in deplorable conditions." The third film, "Locked In" is "a piece depicting the disturbing reality that many youth face in solitary confinement." DeWolf also made three films in collaboration with Write Home, addressing teen homelessness.

Several of the films have been featured on Upworthy. In addition to several Youth Speaks collaborations, his film "Waiting" with performance poet and humorist Thadra Sheridan, called "the best fucking video about waiting tables ever" by The Bitchy Waiter went viral after appearing on UpWorthy and received over a million views. "Ricochet in Reverse," starring Isaac Miller and Rafael Casal is "a lyrical retelling of the Columbine school shootings going in reverse, as a meditation on youth violence and survival through art."

DeWolf's own short films have garnered accolades and awards across the country. His short noir film "A Girl and a Gun" won "Best Acting Performance at Briefs Erotic Short Film Festival. and "Best Writing" at Rio's Grind Film Fest in a competition judged by The Soska Sisters, the directors of "American Mary." "Hey Baby Hey," a film about cat calling and sexual harassment won the "Grand Prize Audience Award," "Judges Award," "Best Acting Performance" and "Cinematography" at the 2015 Briefs Erotic Film Festival. DeWolf's film about a new dating service for monsters, "OK MONSTER" was the Grand Prize Audience winner at the Scream Horror Film Festival and selected for the Fantastic Planet Festival in Australia. His film "Double Agent" which remixes a sexual identity into James Bond title sequence was selected for the CineKink Film Festival in NYC. His short film "U Turn" was selected for a feature-length horror film anthology franchise by Ruthless Pictures and received international distribution. His short film "Black Out" with Wonder Dave, delving into difficult subject matter talking about kink, sex and race was accepted into the Briefs Erotic Film Festival 2016. DeWolf also directed the controversial "Sweet Sh*t of Christ" music video with Bobby Joe Ebola and the Children MacNuggits that covers centuries of Christian history in a matter of minutes. The video features featuring a black Jesus carrying a crucifix in downtown Oakland followed by Santa Claus, zombies, the Easter Bunny and priests, a recreation of the Jonestown massacre, live snakes and faith healing. After winning their first ever Hosting Competition, DeWolf now hosts the annual Sacramento Horror FIlm Festival, which features horror burlesque acts and live shadowcasting of films like REPO: The Genetic Opera with live appearances by Skinny Puppy's Nivek Ogre.

Family
Formerly Jamie Kennedy, DeWolf took his mother's maiden name in 2006 to avoid confusion with actor and fellow comedian Jamie Kennedy. DeWolf is the great-grandson of L. Ron Hubbard; being the grandson of Hubbard's son Ronald DeWolf (né L. Ron Hubbard, Jr.). DeWolf told the San Francisco Chronicle in 2001 that his mother and girlfriend were visited by Scientology agents, who asked about his comments on Scientology in his poetry and his appearance at a November 2000 benefit for the Lisa McPherson Trust in Clearwater, Florida. The poetry piece was titled "Judas' Son". Initially, the Scientology agents told DeWolf's mother that they were fellow poets, but DeWolf later remarked, "My mom knew from the moment they started talking that they were Scientologists, which they admitted to." DeWolf was quoted as saying, "They can't shut me up." In 2013 That same year he was quoted on The Young Turks as saying that Scientology is one of the most "devious, systematic brainwashing systems that's ever been invented."

Views on Scientology
DeWolf is an outspoken critic of the Church of Scientology. Of his own views on Scientology and his great-grandfather, DeWolf remarked in the East Bay Express: "Scientology is the most brilliantly engineered pyramid scam I've ever seen. L. Ron Hubbard—you can never say that he was an idiot, by any means. He was very intelligent, very sort of evil, malicious; a sort of overman, his will against the world."

In a January 25, 2013, interview with Cenk Uygur on Current TV, DeWolf said that Scientology

In 2015, DeWolf incorporated his monthly show in a special game show aimed at Scientology, including 'a conversation with journalist Tony Ortega, who appeared in HBO's documentary Going Clear: Scientology and the Prison of Belief, and Paulette Cooper, author of The Scandal of Scientology.'

References

External links

Jamie DeWolf on YouTube
"Scientology founder's great grandson rails at cult" Irish Examiner, June 30, 2012
Jamie DeWolf performs "The God and the Man" featured on Upworthy
Jamie DeWolf performs "The Girl in the Hallway" on NPR's Snap Judgement
Jamie DeWolf performs "The Girl in the Hallway" on Upworthy
Jamie Dewolf talks to David Pakman about Scientology
Jamie DeWolf talks to Abby Martin about Scientology
Jamie DeWolf discusses Scientology on CBS
Jamie DeWolf's film "Health Justice Manifesto" on Upworthy 
Jamie DeWolf's film "Pushin' Weight" on Upworthy
Jamie DeWolf's film "Product of his Environment" on Upworthy
Jamie DeWolf's film "Waiting" on Upworthy
Jamie DeWolf's film "Ricochet in Reverse" featuring DeWolf and Suicide King, Geoff Trenchard on Upworthy
Jamie DeWolf's film "Candy Man" on Upworthy
Jamie DeWolf's film "Whispers from the Fields" on Upworthy

1977 births
Living people
American male comedians
21st-century American comedians
American male poets
Critics of Scientology
Entertainers from California
L. Ron Hubbard family
Slam poets
American spoken word poets
Place of birth missing (living people)
Film directors from California